Cindy Pickett is an American actress. She is known for her 1970s role as Jackie Marler-Spaulding on the CBS soap Guiding Light and Dr. Carol Novino on the television drama St. Elsewhere in the 1980s. Pickett, however, is best known to audiences for her lighter turn as Katie Bueller, Ferris Bueller's loving and unsuspecting mother, in the 1986 American comedy movie Ferris Bueller's Day Off.

Other notable cinematic roles and performances include Valerie St. John in Roger Vadim's 1980 film, Jeux de Nuit / Night Games, for which she would have the leading role, and as the tough-as-nails and heroic Dr. Diane Norris in the 1989 sci-fi-horror film DeepStar Six.

Life and career
Pickett was born in Sand Springs, Oklahoma, daughter of Cecil Pickett, a director and drama teacher at the University of Houston. 

Pickett made a major departure from her soap opera image when she played the central role in the 1980 erotic film Jeux de Nuit / Night Games, directed by Roger Vadim. It was a sexually charged role involving numerous nude scenes, however the film went unnoticed and did not boost Pickett's career. In the 1981 mystery/crime drama Margin for Murder, Pickett played the role of Velda, Mike Hammer's (Kevin Dobson) loyal and devoted secretary. She played "Jackie Marler" on the soap opera The Guiding Light from 1976 to 1980, "Vanessa Sarnac" on the ABC weekly TV series Call to Glory from 1984 to 1985, and she appeared as Dr. Carol Novino on the hospital drama TV series St. Elsewhere from 1986 to 1988.

Pickett had a supporting role in the 1987 mini-series Amerika, which she then considered to be her "best part and the best showcase" she ever had. In 1991 she played the part of Addy Mathewson in the TV movie/pilot Plymouth, which at the time was considered to be one of the most expensive such movies ever made. Pickett portrayed the real-life Kay Stayner, the mother of a boy who was kidnapped for several years, in the dramatic TV movie I Know My First Name Is Steven. TV series she has guest-starred on include Riptide, Simon & Simon, Magnum, P.I., L.A. Law, Murder, She Wrote, The Pretender, NYPD Blue, CSI: Miami, Without a Trace, Crossing Jordan and Burn Notice.

Personal life
Pickett dated Roger Vadim, who directed her in Night Games. She met Lyman Ward when they played the parents of the teenaged protagonist in the 1986 film Ferris Bueller's Day Off.  They married in real life, and had two children, divorcing shortly after playing the parents of the teenaged protagonist in the 1992 film Sleepwalkers. Pickett is a collector of stereopticon cards.

Filmography

Film

Television

References

External links

Living people
Actresses from Tulsa, Oklahoma
American film actresses
American soap opera actresses
American television actresses
People from Houston
Lon Morris College alumni
21st-century American women
Year of birth missing (living people)